Lycée Guillaume Apollinaire is a senior high school in Thiais, Val-de-Marne, France, in the Paris metropolitan area.

 the school has 1,150 general students and 250 baccalaureat students.

References

External links
 Lycée Guillaume Apollinaire 

Lycées in Val-de-Marne